Sophie Cauvin (born 2 April 1968) is a Belgian painter.

Personal background 
Sophie Cauvin was born on 2 April 1968 in Braine-l'Alleud, Walloon Brabant, Belgium. She studied at The Royal Academies for Science and the Arts of Belgium.

Exhibitions 
 2004: 5 Bruxelloises Art and Advice at Hasselt Gallery
 2004: Galerie Sans Nom, Brussels
 2005: Personal exhibition at Lucca Gallery New York City
 2006: Galerie Grard Neuchâtel, Switzerland
 2007: Personal exhibition at Gaudaen Galerij, Grimbergen
 2009: Women Art Show, Brussels
 2010: Guy Pieters Gallery Knokke Belgique

Further reading 
 Ladolfi, Giuliano (2012). Sophie Cauvin. Ediz. italiana, inglese, francese e tedesca, Giuliano Ladolfi Editore, 300 pages.

References

External links 

 
 Sophie Cauvin at LaGalerie in Belgium

1968 births
Living people
20th-century Belgian women artists
21st-century Belgian women artists
People from Braine-l'Alleud
Belgian painters